“Sean South of Garryowen” is a song about Seán South, (written by Seán Costelloe) a member of the Pearse Column of the Irish Republican Army, who was fatally wounded during the attack on Brookeborough barracks in 1957. It is sung to the same tune as “Roddy McCorley". The words were first published in the Irish Catholic, the Irish weekly Roman Catholic newspaper, within a week of South's death.

Contrary to popular belief, South was not actually from the area of Garryowen, this being poetic licence on the part of the writer. The song was translated into Swedish in 2008 by musicians Björn Alling and Conny Olsson. It has also been satirised in the Rubberbandits song "Up da Ra", from their 2011 album Serious About Men.

References

Notes

External links
Lyrics to the Wolftones version

Irish songs